Musabani, also spelt as Mosabani or Mushabani, is a census town in the Musabani CD block in the Ghatshila subdivision of the Purbi Singhbhum district in the Indian state of Jharkhand.

History

Origin of the town dates backs before the independence of India.  Mining was done from the ancient time but the place saw an economic boom when mining was restarted by the British. Mines situated in Musabani are some of the first copper mines of then British India. Mining started in early 1930s as the first mine. Banalopa mine was started in 1928.

Location 

Musabani is situated in the lap of Singhbhum Shear Zone, geologically one of the richest places of Indian Subcontinent. This can be said a Geologist's Paradise. Surrounded by mountains and lush green vegetation, Musabani is also home to a group of Copper Mines once run by Hindustan Copper Limited. Banalopa, located in Musabani once had the reputation of being second deepest mine in India after Kolar Gold mine. Musabani boasts of being the site of oldest copper mine to be developed in India in modern times. Best time to visit Musabani is from September to March. The most exciting feature of this small town is that one can get people from various parts of India as well as Nepal living side by side. So much of anthropological diversity in such a small place is very rare. People of Musabani are known for their helping nature and love for humanity.

Area overview  
The area shown  in the map “forms a part of the Chota Nagpur Plateau and is a hilly upland tract”.  The main rivers draining the district are the Subarnarekha and the Kharkai. The area lying between Jamshedpur and Ghatshila is the main industrial mining zone. The rest of the district is primarily agricultural. In the district, as of 2011,  56.9% of the population lives in the rural areas and a high 43.1% lives in the urban areas.

Note: The map alongside presents some of the notable locations in the district. All places marked in the map are linked in the larger full screen map.

Halkas of Musabani 
Halka-1 Bara Jharnahil, Swaspur, Chapri, Kumhirmudi, Roam, Kulamara & Patkita.
Halka-2 Forest Block, Chakulia, Netra, Somaidih, Kendadih & Terega.
Halka-3 Benasol, Shahda, Surda, Uparbandh, Tilabani, Kadamdih, Dhobuni, Barunia, Laukeshra, Pathargoda, Medhia, Musabani & Rangamatia.
Halka-4 Bikrampur, Phuljhari, Bhaduia, Bakrra, Kat Sankra, Patnipal, Raipahari & Latia.
Halka-5 Bhandarboro, Bhuinyaboro, Kodasol, Bangoda, Niranjankocha, Kuilisuta & Kakdaha.

Civic administration  
There is a police station at Musabani.

The headquarters of the Musabani CD block is located at  Musabani village.

Demographics
According to the 2011 Census of India,Musabani had a total population of 31,035, of which 16,063 (52%) were males and 14,972 (48%) were females. Population in the age range 0–6 years was 3,537. The total number of literate persons in Musabani was 21,778 (79.20% of the population over 6 years).

(*For language details see Musabani block#Language and religion)

As of 2001 India census, Musabani had a population of 33,892. Males constitute 52% of the population and females 48%. Musabani has an average literacy rate of 67%, higher than the national average of 59.5%: male literacy is 76%, and female literacy is 58%. In Musabani, 12% of the population is under 6 years of age.

Infrastructure 
Among the civic amenities, it had  of roads with both closed and open drains, the protected water supply involved tapwater from treated sources, hand pump, overhead tank. It had 5,984 domestic electric connections, 350 road lighting points. Among the medical facilities, it had 1 hospital (with 155 beds), 2 dispensaries, 2 health centres, 1 family welfare centre, 55 maternity and child welfare centres, 1 maternity homes, 1 nursing home, 13 veterinary hospitals, 4 medicine shops. Among the educational facilities it had 20 primary schools, 8 middle schools, 5 secondary schools, 2 senior secondary schools, 2 general degree colleges. It had 1 non-formal education centre (Sarva Shiksha Abhiyan). Among social, cultural and recreational facilities, it had 1 orphanage home. Important commodities it produced were copper, mats, baskets, earthen pots. It had the branch offices of 2 nationalised banks, 1 private commercial bank, 1 cooperative bank, 1 agricultural credit society.

Economy
The place had a glorious past but with Hindustan Copper Limited mine closure the economy declined. With very less job opportunities forcing migration for the emigrants as well as locals to the nearby cities Ghatsila, Jamshedpur and other parts of the Globe. One can find squatters in every part of the colony with mostly unemployed

Culture
Rankini Devi a deity of Bhuinya origin is considered the patron deity of the region and is revered by all people of Musabani in high esteem. A shrine dedicated to the goddess is located in the lap of Dhanjouri Hills, locally called Dhobni near the Uranium town of Jaduguda around 20 km north. Makar Sankranti is celebrated as harvest festival by people of this region in which they wear new clothes and throng to village fairs. Durga Pooja, Diwali, Sohrai, Id, Bakrid, Badadin or Christmas, Saraswati Pooja and Holi are other important festivals celebrated. Rathayatra, Chariot festival of lord Jagannatha is another addition to its already vibrant cultural panorama awakening true nature of universal brotherhood imbibed in every fellow resident of Musabani.

References

Cities and towns in East Singhbhum district